Gregor Edmunds (born 1977) is a Scottish Highland Games competitor and strongman. Gregor is a winner of the World Highland Games Championships, world record holder in Highland games throwing the 28lb weight 95’10.5" Highlander Challenge, and Scotland's Strongest Man.

Background
Edmunds was born in 1977 to Moira and Douglas Edmunds and grew up in the south of Glasgow. Edmunds' paternal grandfather, John Morris from Fife, is said to have been part of a gang of fervent Scottish nationalists that included the poet Hugh MacDiarmid, which planned to steal the Stone of Destiny from Westminster Abbey. Such was John Morris' strength that he was to be responsible for carrying the stone, and trained for this task by lifting a heavy steel ingot at his work at the Beardmore forge in Glasgow. The family changed the name from Morris to Edmunds because John was convicted of bigamy and desertion. Gregor Edmunds' great-grandfather, also called John Morris, fought for money in boxing booths. Gregor's father, Douglas was the World Caber Tossing Champion in the 1970s and wrote an autobiography titled "The World's Greatest Tosser". Douglas was also a founder of The World's Strongest Man competition. Despite being immersed in strength sports Edmunds initially asked for a skateboard for his tenth birthday but was given a shot put. Following in his father's footsteps, he began training for Highland Games events and at the age of 17 he was Scottish Junior Highland Games Champion. Additionally, he studied and completed an HND in Sports Therapy Twickenham.

Career
After winning the Scottish Junior Highland Games Championship he went on to compete in Highland Games events around the world. Like with his father he competed in the Braemar Gathering.  They remain the only father and son combination to have won the famous Braemar Caber and the overall points championship. In 2007 he became IHGF World Highland Games Champion, ending a five-year American hold on that title. In 2010 Edmunds won the SHGA World Championship. Edmunds also competed successfully in strongman competitions, winning the title of Scotland's Strongest Man in 2002 and going on to compete at the World's Strongest Man reaching the grand finals and finishing in 8th place. He was also second in Britain's Strongest Man in 2002 and 2003.

Gregor set an SHGA Highland Games world record in the 28 lb. weight for distance at the 2011 Markinch Highland Games on 5 June 2011. His world record throw was 95'10.5", a full 3'5" further than the previous world record. This throw also broke the American record by 1'4"and is officially recognised as the biggest throw of all time.

Gregor won the 2011 Highlander Challenge on 18 June 2011.

The Highlander Challenge

The lack of young Scottish Highland Games competitors led Edmunds and his father to organise the Highlander Challenge. In 2007 the Highlander Challenge was successful in achieving record-breaking viewing figures for its time slot enough to spawn a larger event in 2008 at Scone Palace.

Strength Sport Specialist
Edmunds is the managing director of The Highland Games Consultancy ltd, Organising and running Highland Games and Strength Athletics events throughout the world.

Edmunds is also the Equipment Manager at the World Strongest Man event and has held this position since 2008, designing and fabricating new concepts and equipment for World Strongest Man.

Personal life
Gregor currently lives in Glasgow on his father's estate in the Village of Carmunnock on Glasgow's south side. gregor is Divorced and has one daughter Izabella.

References

External links
 https://web.archive.org/web/20140419013828/http://www.hgc-ltd.com/ Highland Games Consultancy Ltd

1977 births
Scottish strength athletes
Scottish highland games competitors
Sportspeople from Glasgow
Living people